Pinós is a village and municipality in the province of Lleida and autonomous community of Catalonia, Spain. The municipality includes a small exclave to the north-east. The village is regarded as the geographical centre of Catalonia, and there is a plaque set in the ground at its claimed location.

References

External links

 
Government data pages 

Municipalities in Solsonès
Populated places in Solsonès